The 1961 Miami Hurricanes football team represented the University of Miami as an independent during the 1961 NCAA University Division football season. Led by 14th-year head coach Andy Gustafson, the Hurricanes played their home games at the Miami Orange Bowl in Miami, Florida. The Hurricanes finished 7–4 and were invited to the Liberty Bowl, where they lost to Syracuse.

Schedule

Roster
QB #10 George Mira, So.

References

Miami
Miami Hurricanes football seasons
Miami Hurricanes football